or  is a large island in Troms og Finnmark county, Norway. It is divided between the municipalities of Tromsø and Karlsøy. Several islands surround Ringvassøya including Kvaløya to the south; Reinøya and Karlsøya to the east; Vannøya, Helgøya, and Nordkvaløya to the north; and Rebbenesøya to the north west. The island is connected to the neighboring island (and the rest of mainland Norway) by the Kvalsund Tunnel on the south shore of the island.

The villages of Hansnes (the administrative centre of Karlsøy Municipality), Hessfjord, Indre Kårvik, and Skarsfjord are all located on the island. In 2018, there were about 1,300 people living on the island.

See also
List of islands of Norway

References

Tromsø
Karlsøy
Islands of Troms og Finnmark